The Cook is a 1965 Soviet comedy film directed by Edmond Keosayan.

Plot 
A beautiful cook girl comes to one Kuban collective farm and she immediately attracted the attention of many men who began to look after her. But only one of them she reciprocated.

Cast 
 Svetlana Svetlichnaya as Pavlina Khutornaya
 Lyudmila Khityaeva as Galina Sakhno
 Inna Churikova as Varvara
 Konstantin Sorokin as Sliva
 Georgi Yumatov as Serafim Ivanovich Chaika
 Ivan Savkin as Stepan Kazanets
 Lyudmila Marchenko  as Taisya
 Vladimir Vysotsky	as 	Andrey
 Zoya Fyodorova	as head of crooks in the market
 Sergey Filippov	as crook in the market
 Valery Nosik as Gregory, Varvara's husband
 Eduard Abalov as crook in the market

References

External links 
 

1965 films
1960s Russian-language films
Soviet comedy films
1965 comedy films

Mosfilm films
Films directed by Edmond Keosayan
Films about food and drink